Glastonbury is a town in Somerset, England.

Glastonbury or Glastenbury may also refer to:

 Glastonbury Festival, a music and performing arts festival founded in 1970 near the English town, formerly Glastonbury Fair
 Glastonbury Festival (1914–25), a cultural festival founded by the composer Rutland Boughton

Media
 Glastonbury (film), a 2006 documentary by Julien Temple about the modern English festival
 Glastonbury Fayre (album), album of the 1971 Glastonbury Fair
 Glastonbury Fayre (film), a 1972 documentary film by Nicolas Roeg and Peter Neal of the 1971 Glastonbury Fair

Places

Australia 
 Glastonbury, Queensland, a locality in the Gympie Region, Queensland
 Glastonbury Division, a former local government area in Queensland, Australia

Canada 
 Glastonbury, Edmonton, a residential neighbourhood in Alberta, Canada

United Kingdom 
 Glastonbury Abbey, a ruined monastery in the English town
 Glastonbury Canal, England
 Glastonbury Tor, a hill near the English town
 Glastonbury and Street railway station, a former station in England

United States 
 Glastonbury, Connecticut, a town in the United States formerly called Glastenbury
 Glastonbury Center, Connecticut, a census-designated place, center of the town
 Glastenbury, Vermont, a town in the United States
 Glastenbury Mountain, a mountain in Vermont, United States
 Glastenbury Wilderness, Vermont, United States

People
 Ray Glastonbury (born 1938), British rugby league footballer

Other uses
 Glastonbury F.C., a football club based in Glastonbury, England

See also